Vice Admiral Morton Lyndholm Deyo (1 July 1887 – 10 November 1973) was an officer in the United States Navy, who was a naval gunfire support task force commander of World War II.

Born on 1 July 1887 in Poughkeepsie, New York, he graduated from the United States Naval Academy in 1911, and served over a career of 38 years. His highest Navy rank in active service was Rear Admiral, attaining Vice Admiral at retirement. He was awarded three medals of personal honor, the Distinguished Service Medal (Navy), and the Legion of Merit with Gold Star.

Deyo served in both the Atlantic and Pacific Fleets. In the Atlantic, he commanded the destroyers which provided the first American escort assistance to allied convoys to England just prior to the Japanese attack on Pearl Harbor. He later commanded naval gunfire support at Utah Beach in the Normandy invasion, Task Force 129 at the Bombardment of Cherbourg, as well as during the invasion of Southern France.

When transferred to the Pacific, Rear Admiral Deyo assumed command of Cruiser Division 13 (CruDiv 13). He commanded gunfire and covering force for the assault and occupation of Battle of Okinawa. At the war's end, he accepted the surrender of Japanese forces at Sasebo, Kyushu and directed the Allied Occupation of Western Japan.

Early career

Morton Deyo's career ashore meshed with the seagoing responsibilities he would take on at each stage of his career. Training at the U.S. Naval Academy prepared him in engineering and seamanship. He graduated as a member of the Class of 1911. Most of his academy years were under Superintendent Captain John M. Bowyer at a time of two-year rotations. Deyo then took his first assignment at sea aboard the battleship .

Caribbean service

Early assignments at sea placed Morton Deyo in the Caribbean. 
Morton Deyo was aboard the battleship  about the time she participated in coaling-at-sea operations. In the years of his service aboard Virginia, she would take station off Tampico and Vera Cruz, Mexico. Deyo next served aboard the destroyer . In a tour cut short by decommissioning in 1914, Duncan went to the Caribbean for training, target practice and exercises. In 1914 and 1915, Deyo served aboard the armored cruiser  under Captain Edward W. Eberle, commanding. The ship was stationed off of Santo Domingo, Dominican Republic, for diplomatic service; Vera Cruz, Mexico; Cap Haitien, Haiti; and returned to Puerto Plata, Dominican Republic, when a crisis recurred there.  Deyo's last tour in the Caribbean before marriage and World War I was aboard the destroyer . She sailed to Tampico, Mexico and later supported the U.S. occupation of Vera Cruz. Jenkins was assigned patrol operations to search for possible German U-boats. Deyo married Maria Ten Eyck Decatur Mayo in 1916.

As an aide to the Commandant, First Naval District, Boston, 1920–1921, Deyo was a part of an ongoing upgrading of Naval District that would remain in place from 1920 to the outbreak of World War II. The First District absorbed the Second in 1919, and it expanded from a coastal strip to encompass inland states to more nearly correspond to Army districts. The District acquired its own full-time staff, gained new operational functions, and expanded administrative and logistical responsibilities. Proposal for reform of the Naval district regulations were to be revised to embody the lessons of World War I. This is fundamental naval strategy. Mahan had written, "deficient coast protection reacts unfavorably upon the war fleet, which in all its movements should be free from any responsibility for the mere safety of the ports it quits." Deyo's next assignment was as an aide to the U.S. military governor at Santo Domingo, Dominican Republic.

Service aboard one ship and command of another prepared Deyo for duty ashore in a politically and diplomatically sensitive role. In 1914–1915, Deyo had served on the armored cruiser  during service related to Santo Domingo, Dominican Republic, Vera Cruz, Mexico, and Cape Haitien, Haiti. Capt. Edward W. Eberle, commanding, was active in U.S. attempts to mediate between government and insurgent forces towards a constitutional government with "observed" elections. When then Lieutenant Commander Deyo had his first command, of the destroyer , he was attached to the "Adriatic Detachment" performing political and diplomatic duties among nations of the former Austro-Hungarian Empire. In 1921–1923, Deyo served on the staff of the military governor closing out the American occupation of Santo Domingo. The military governor at the time was Warren Harding's appointment to fulfill his campaign promise to end the Wilson occupation of the Dominican Republic. Rear Adm. Samuel Robison served from 1921. The occupation officially ended July 1, 1924. 
In 1923 Deyo was assigned to the staff Battleship Fleet, aboard the battleship .

World War I

As a part of the new full-time staff in the First Naval District, Boston, in 1918, Deyo taught destroyer seamanship. He was assigned the year after Rear Admiral Albert Gleaves, then Commander, Destroyer Force, Atlantic Fleet, became Commander of United States Convoy Operations in the Atlantic in addition to his other duties. He was next transferred to the troopship Northern Pacific as a part of its regular USN officer complement. World War I's movement of a million men and their supplies was unprecedented. The crews of harbor and pilot boats, inshore scouts and patrol craft, new merchantmen, escorting vessels, all required training. In the First Naval District, Deyo was a part of the destroyer piece.

Interwar

1920s Pacific

Now a Lieutenant Commander, Deyo was the most junior officer as Flag Lieutenant. The next rung up the ladder was the Assistant Chief of Staff, then Commander Chester W. Nimitz.

Following early armored cruiser service in the Caribbean, World War I destroyer service operating in the North Atlantic, and cruiser service crossing the Pacific, Deyo was assigned to a three-year tour teaching seamanship at the Naval Academy, 1926–1929. He was appointed during the tenure of Superintendent Rear Admiral Louis M. Nulton and completed his tour under Rear Admiral Samuel S. Robison with whom he had served in the Dominican Republic. 
He returned to sea to take command of the destroyer .

His exemplary promise as a commander at sea resulted in an appointment to the Naval War College staff immediately following his study there. He then returned to sea in 1934 as the Executive Officer aboard the light cruiser .

1930s Pacific

World War II in the Atlantic

With accumulating experience in escort service in the Atlantic, fleet staff service crossing the Pacific, and Asiatic Squadron staff duty for operations and war plans during Japanese expansion, Deyo was prepared for Main Navy assignments from 1939 to 1941 as the Navy's assistant hydographer, then aide to the Secretary of the Navy until war sent him to sea again.

Then a Captain, Deyo was escort commander of Task Unit 4.1.1 and the Commodore of Destroyer Squadron 11. His group was tasked to escort 44 merchant ships ranging from a luxury liner to a rusty ship of the Levant. The others were "four-pipers" with "outmoded equipment and low fuel capacity" including the ships of two other squadron commanders. Canadian escorts protected the convoy for the first 350 miles, then the Americans until point "Momp" when the British escorted ships to Britain. Deyo then proceeded with the American destroyers to Iceland with three American merchantmen and one Icelandic.

There was no submarine attack, but the Navy destroyers were inexperienced in their seamanship. They progressed from patrolling only on calm moonlit nights within 1,000 yards of the convoy and staying on station if there was fog, to patrolling 5,000 yards out whatever the sea condition or visibility. U-boat searches were extended to over an hour at a time. Still there was extra work to escorting this convoy. Stragglers, breakdowns and laggards created a ragged formation which was difficult to cordon. The convoy could not sit in the water, so it made numerous course changes to buy time for at-sea overhaul of those falling behind. Nevertheless, when the Nigaristan sank in high winds and rolling seas, the Eberle rescued the entire 63-man crew. On return to the U.S., "Captain Deyo made a number of adversely critical comments in his report" relative to the demands of anti-submarine warfare, "leadership, seamanship and marksmanship."

On 6 June 1944, now Rear Admiral Deyo commanded the western Operation Neptune Force "U", supporting the landing of the American First Army at Utah and Omaha beaches during the Normandy landings.

Deyo served as Commander, Task Force 129 (CTF 129) during the Bombardment of Cherbourg, and supported General Collins' Army VII Corps in taking Cherbourg, France. The American and British ships dueled port-city shore batteries and surrounding German defenses.

Deyo commanded the naval bombardment for the invasion of Southern France in August 1944 and received Legion of Honour, Officer by the Government of France.

World War II in the Pacific

Admiral Deyo's crowning achievement in the Pacific was command of gunfire and covering force for the assault and occupation of Okinawa. It was for service off Okinawa that he was awarded the Navy Distinguished Service Medal.

Rear Admiral Deyo took over Cruiser Division 13 (CruDiv 13) from Rear Admiral Laurance T. DuBose.

From 24 March to 4 May 1945, Task Force 54 under the command of Rear Adm. Deyo commanded battleships, cruisers and destroyers in the bombardment of Kerama Retto and the southeast coast of Okinawa, Japan. 
Following the war, he directed the landing of occupation forces in Northern Japan.

Cold War

Morton Deyo's last duty station, from 1946 to 1949, was as Commandant of the First Naval District, headquartered at the Boston Navy Yard.  The First Naval District exercised administrative supervision of all Navy activities in the New England states, except for Connecticut.

Working out inter-service and inter-department conflicts was a serious goal for the U.S. Navy going into the Cold War. As of September 1945, the qualifications for a district commandant were those of a line officer eligible for command at sea, and the shipyard (specialist) commands were no longer to be held by the same officer. Deyo met the new qualification for District Commandant, and had served at Boston twice before as an instructor and aide to the Commandant during a time of reorganization. Inefficiency from command conflicts were taken under study even before the war ended by the "Farber Committee".

The main feature of reform related to the various types of authority over district activities. The Commandant was to have coordinating "military command" over all activities in the district akin to Army districts. The Navy Secretary directed satisfactory relationships.  With a background of local relationships, technical expertise, leadership and diplomatic skills, Morton Deyo was the man chosen to make it happen.

He retired at the end of his tour with a promotion to vice admiral.  In retirement he lived at Hooke's Cove in Kittery Point, Maine.  In 1959 he was elected as an honorary member of the New Hampshire Society of the Cincinnati.

Admiral Deyo died November 10, 1973 at his home in Kittery Point, Maine.

Namesake

The destroyer  was the 27th  and the first ship to be named to honor Vice Admiral Deyo. She was commissioned on March 22, 1980. The Deyo was last home-ported in Norfolk, Virginia. Stricken from the Navy list on April 6, 2003, she was sunk as a target on August 25, 2005 in the Atlantic.

Biographical timeline

Milestones

1887, July 1 Born, Poughkeepsie, N.Y.

1916 Married Maria Ten Eyck Decatur Mayo

1949 Retired from navy as vice admiral

1973, Nov. 10 Died, Portsmouth, N.H.

Early service

1911 Graduated, United States Naval Academy

1918 Trained destroyer crews, First Naval District, Boston, Mass.

Interwar

1919–1920 Commanding  (Destroyer), Adriatic, Mediterranean

1920–1921 Aide to commandant, First Naval District, Boston, Mass.

1921–1923 Aide to military governor, Santo Domingo

1923–1925 Staff, Battleship Fleet,  (Flagship)

1925–1926 Staff, U.S. Fleet,  (Flagship)

1926–1929 Instructor in seamanship, U.S. Naval Academy

1929–1930 Commanding  (Destroyer)

1930–1931 Commanding  (Destroyer)

1931–1934 Student, staff, Naval War College, Newport, RI

1934–1936 Executive officer,  (Light cruiser)

Pre-war

1936–1939 Operations and war plans, staff, U.S. Asiatic Fleet,  (Flag)

1939–1940 Assistant hydrographer, Navy Department, Washington DC

1940–1941 Aide to Secretary of the Navy, Washington DC

Atlantic

1941 Commanding Destroyer Squadron II, Atlantic, first convoy to Iceland

1942 Commanding  (Auxiliary transport)

1942 Commanding  (Heavy cruiser), Aleutians bombardment

1942–1943 Commanding destroyers, Atlantic Fleet

1944 Commanding Ranger Task Group Atlantic

1944 Commanded bombardment, Normandy and southern France, Atlantic

Pacific

1944 Commanded Cruiser Division 13, Task Forces in 3rd and 5th Fleets, Pacific

1945 Commanded Task Force 54, Okinawa campaign, Pacific

Post-war

1945 Commanded Task Forces 55 and 56, surrender, occupation of Japan

1946–1949 Commandant, First Naval District, Boston, Mass.

November 10, 1973 Admiral Deyo dies in Kittery Point, Maine

References

External links
Page with photos of various admirals, including Deyo 

1887 births
1973 deaths
United States Navy vice admirals
United States Naval Academy alumni
Recipients of the Navy Distinguished Service Medal
Recipients of the Legion of Merit
People from Poughkeepsie, New York